Stéphane Marie-Eugène Reuchsel (21 July 1900 – 22 September 1988) was a French pianist, a specialist of Chopin and Liszt, organist and composer.

Biography 
Born in Lyon, a descendant of an illustrious family of musicians of German origin, he was Amédée Reuchsel's (1875–1931) son. He studied piano, organ and music composition at the Conservatoire de Paris, where he won the First prize. He won the First Prize in piano at the age of 16.

After completing his studies, he was engaged as a soloist in renowned orchestras of Paris: the Concerts Colonne, Orchestre Lamoureux, Pasdeloup Orchestra. Since then, he gave numerous recitals in Europe, America and North Africa, where marshal Lyautey gave him the best reception.

After the Second World War, Reuchsel continued his international tours: West Africa, Equatorial Africa, Madagascar, Reunion Islands and Mauritius, etc. At the same time, he performed in all the major Parisian theatres: Châtelet, Édouard VII, Mogador, Théâtre des Champs-Elysées, Erard, Gaveau, Pleyel, Palais de Chaillot during the "Grandes Nuits musicales", etc.

Between two tours, Reuchsel used to come to his villa "Croknotes", built in 1927 at Rayol by architect Édouard Mas. The house, close to the sea, opens widely on this last one. One of the peculiarities of the villa is that it has an organ in the living room, with a wind tunnel in the basement. There are also two concert pianos, one of which was given at the Town Hall of Rayol-Canadel. Reuchsel also trained students, such as composer Jean-Patrick André born in 1954.

Reuchsel died in 1988. He is buried in the Rayol-Canadel cemetery. On his tomb, a medallion recalls the motto of his life: "Music was our secret, our ideal, our joy of life."

Distinctions 
  Officier of the Légion d'honneur,
  Chevalier of the Order of the Black Star.

Works

For piano 
 3 Bourrées, Paris, Billaudot.

For organ 
 Promenades en Provence, (1938–1973), three collections, Lemoine
 Vieux Noëls Provençaux (Nuit de Noël à Saint-Tropez)
 Les Grandes Orgues de la Basilique de Saint-Maximin
 Tambourinaires sur la place des Vieux Salins
 Nuages ensoleillés sur le Cap Nègre
 Le Cloître de Saint-Trophime à Arles
 Petit Cimetière et Cyprès autour de la vieille église de Bormes-les-Mimosas
 Voiles multicolores au port de Toulon
 Les Cloches de Notre-Dame des Doms en Avignon
 Jour de fête aux Saintes-Maries de la Mer
 Profil de la Porte d’Orange à Carpentras
 Le Moulin d’Alphonse Daudet à Fontvieille
 La Chartreuse de Montrieux au crépuscule
 Visions à l’Abbaye de Sénanque: La Foi en Dieu – La Joie en Dieu

 Évocation de Louis Vierne, (1979)
 Lent et large: La rosace ensoleillée scintille de mille feux colorés au-dessus du Grand Orgue
 Très lent et douloureux: Son âme d’artiste chante l’espoir de sa délivrance des ténèbres
 Très lent: La lumière géniale luit dans ses yeux d’aveugle

 Huit Images de Provence, (1984), Universal
 Assauts de vagues aux rochers de l’Ile de Port-Cros
 Balancements des barcasses colorées au Vieux Port de Saint-Tropez
 Hallucinante évocation des Moines aux ruines de la Chartreuse de la Verne
 L’Étoile Radieuse de Moustiers Sainte-Marie
 Humble petit oratoire à l’ombre d’oliviers séculaires
 Coucher de Soleil sur les majestueuses Tours du Château de Lourmann
 Douceur des Champs de Lavande fleurie
 Coup de Mistral en Garrigue Provençale

 Six Pièces de Concert, en hommage à la mémoire d’Aristide Cavaillé-Coll (1985/86), Universal
 Prélude en style fugué double
 Intermède (Obsession d'un thème) 
 Quiétude et Espérance
 Joies et Enthousiasmes
 Recueillement et Béatitude
 Final en style Toccata

 Bouquet de France (1986/87), Universal
 Le pauvre Laboureur (version Bressanne)
 Rossignolet du Bois joli (version Bressanne)
 La Fille aux Oranges (version Niçoise)
 Le Retour du Marin (version de l’Ouest)
 Là-haut sur la Montagne (Pastourelle d’Alsace)
 Douce Merveille (Noël Strasbourgeois de 1697)
 Voici le joli Mois de Mai (version Dauphinoise)
 Ma Mère m’envoie-t-au Marché (version de l’Ouest)
 Berceuse (du pays d’Auvergne)
 V’là la Saint-Martin (version Bressanne)

 La Vie du Christ: Évocations d’après l’Évangile de Saint Luc for Grand-Organ (1987) Universal, 2006
 L’Annonciation (Luc 1, 31)
 La Nativité (Luc 2, 6-7)
 Le Baptême (Luc 3, 21-22)
 La Prophétie accomplie (Luc 4, 20-21)
 Les Béatitudes (Luc 6, 20)
 La Pécheresse pardonnée (Luc 7, 47 et 50)
 La Tempête apaisée (Luc 8, 24-25)
 La Multiplication des Pains (Luc 9, 16-17)
 La Transfiguration (Luc 9, 32 et 35)
 La Parabole de la lumière (Luc 11, 33 et 36)
 La Grâce de Dieu (Luc 17, 21)
 Les Enfants jouent près de Jésus (Luc 18, 16-17)
 L’Aveugle (Luc 18, 35-42)
 L’Entrée à Jérusalem (Luc 19, 37-38)
 La Cène (Luc 22, 19)
 Le Crucifiement (Luc 23, 33)
 La Résurrection (Luc 24, 5-6)
 La Promenade à Emmaüs (Luc 24, 30-31)
 L’Ascension (Luc 24, 50-51)
 Le Crucifiement (Luc 23, 33)
 La Résurrection (Luc 24, 5-6)
 La Promenade à Emmaüs (Luc 24, 30-31)
 L’Ascension (Luc 24, 50-51)

Discography 
 Éditions Lade Recordings of the main organ works of the Reuchsel family.
 France Orgue Discography established by Alain Cartayrade.
 Pro Organo Promenades en Provence complete, recorded at St Louis' Cathedral, St Louis, Missouri.
 Resonus Classics La Vie du Christ and Bouquet de France complete, recorded at St Giles' Cathedral, Edinburgh.

Listening 
 YouTube Pierre Labric plays 2 excerpts from the Promenades en Provence: 4. Nuages ensoleillés sur le Cap Nègre, and 3. Visions à l'abbaye de Sénanque (3rd part), on the Cavaillé-Coll organ of the Abbatiale Saint-Ouen of Rouen.
 YouTube Julien Girard joue La Chartreuse de Montrieux au crépuscule, No 12 of the Promenades en Provence, on the Casavant organ of the église Saint Pierre-Claver, Montréal.
 YouTube La Grâce de Dieu, from La Vie du Christ, by Fritz Anders on the St. Gabriel the Archangel Episcopal Church organ, Cherry Hills, Denver, Colorado.

References

External links 
 Eugène Reuchsel on Naxos
 Eugène Reuchsel on Classical Archives
 Eugène Reuchsel on Forgotten records

Musicians from Lyon
1900 births
1988 deaths
Conservatoire de Paris alumni
French male composers
20th-century French male classical pianists
French classical organists
French male organists
20th-century French composers
French composers of sacred music
Chevaliers of the Légion d'honneur
20th-century organists
Male classical organists